Abdelaziz Mousa (born July 8, 1989) is an Egyptian professional footballer who plays as a defensive midfielder for the Egyptian club Al Mokawloon Al Arab SC. Mousa was loaned to Al-Masry from ENPPI for six months, he then moved to El Dakhleya in a free transfer with 2-year contract. In 2017, he signed a 2-year contract for El-Entag El-Harby.

References

External links
Abdel Aziz Mousa at KOOORA.com
Abdelaziz Mousa at Footballdatabase

Living people
Egyptian footballers
Association football midfielders
El Entag El Harby SC players
ENPPI SC players
El Dakhleya SC players
Al Masry SC players
Al Mokawloon Al Arab SC players
Egyptian Premier League players
1989 births